The 13235 / 36 Sahibganj - Danapur Intercity Express is an Express train belonging to Indian Railways East Central Railway zone that runs between Sahibganj Junction railway station and  in India.

Coaches
The 13235 / 36 Sahibganj - Danapur Intercity Express has one AC chair car, twenty general unreserved & two SLR (seating with luggage rake) coaches . It does not carry a pantry car coach.

As is customary with most train services in India, coach composition may be amended at the discretion of Indian Railways depending on demand.

Service

Routing

Traction
As the route was electrified in May 2019, a  based WAP-4 diesel locomotive pulls the train to its destination.

References

External links
13235 Intercity Express at India Rail Info
13236 Intercity Express at India Rail Info

Intercity Express (Indian Railways) trains
Rail transport in Jharkhand
Rail transport in Bihar
Transport in Patna